Manju Sharma may refer to:
 Manju Sharma (biologist) (born 1940), Indian biologist
 Manju Sharma (actor), an Indian actor in F.I.R.